Into the Rainbow (titled: 奇迹：追逐彩虹; The Wonder: Chasing Rainbows) is a fantasy adventure film directed by Norman Stone, co-directed by Gary Wing-Lun Mak, and written by Ashley Sidaway and Robert Sidaway. It is a remake of the 1996 film Rainbow. The film stars Willow Shields, 吴磊 (Wu Lei), Maria Grazia Cucinotta, 陈乔恩 (Joe Chen), Jacqueline Joe, Archie Kao and 钟丽缇 (Christy Chung). The film is a co-production between China and New Zealand. The film was shot in 3D.

Plot
Two troubled teenage girls, Rachel and Grace, discover an incredible natural phenomenon and find themselves transported inside a super-powered rainbow to China. Due to this, they disturbed nature's balance and are chased down by an obsessed scientist and her mysterious international organization. Using Rachel's  connection to the energy of the rainbow and with help from their new friend Xiao Cheng, they must race against time to  restore nature's balance before catastrophic storms destroy the entire Pacific and threaten the world.

Cast
Willow Shields as Rachel
Maria Grazia Cucinotta as Julia Bianchi 
Leo Wu as Xiao Cheng 
Jacqueline Joe as Grace
Joe Chen as Lian
Archie Kao as Song 
Christy Chung as Mei 
Emmett Skilton as Tom Williams
Tania Nolan as Lindsay 
Bruce Hopkins as Major 
Chelsie Preston Crayford as Susan 
Peter Feeney as Scientist 
Colin Moy as Ben
Tessa Rao as Koia 
Sophie McIntosh as Koia's girl
Sylvia Rands as Gini  
Talia Pua as Sea Shore customer 
Scarlett Sills as young Rachel

Production
The film was shot in Qingdao, China and Auckland, New Zealand.

Release
The film was shown at the TIFF Kids International Film Festival during April 2017.

The film received its United States. Premiere with a Gala Screening at the Savannah Film Festival on 4 November 2017. and was Opening Night film of the Asia Pacific Film Festival in Auckland on 28 October 2017.

After a limited theatrical release in China during April 2019, the film was scheduled for a nationwide release on January 25, 2020, during the Chinese New Year holidays. Due to the coronavirus outbreak, the release was delayed and the film made available through the Smart Cinema online app. It was subsequently announced that the film's theatrical release in China was scheduled for April 5, 2020.

Novel

A novel titled The Wonder, Into The Rainbow was written by Robert Sidaway and Ashley Sidaway based on the story and screenplay. The book includes a foreword written by Willow Shields. It was first published by Steam Press, part of the Eunoia Publishing Group, in October 2017. In 2019 it was made available as an ebook in both English and Simplified Chinese.

References

External links

2010s fantasy adventure films
2017 3D films
2017 films
Chinese 3D films
Chinese fantasy adventure films
Films set in China
Films shot in China
New Zealand 3D films
New Zealand fantasy adventure films
2010s English-language films
English-language Chinese films